Long Dark Night is a 2004 Croatian film dealing with World War II in Croatia and its aftermath. It was directed by Antun Vrdoljak and starred Goran Višnjić. It was Croatia's submission to the 77th Academy Awards for the Academy Award for Best Foreign Language Film, but was not accepted as a nominee.

The film was also adapted into a 13-episode TV series broadcast by the Croatian Radiotelevision in 2005.

Cast 
 Goran Višnjić - Ivan Kolar - Iva
 Mustafa Nadarević - Španac
 Ivo Gregurević - Major
 Goran Navojec - Matija Čačić - Mata
 Boris Dvornik - Luka Kolar
 Tarik Filipović - Joka
  - Vera Kolar
 Žarko Potočnjak - Alojz
 Vera Zima - Kata
 Alen Liverić - Jozef Schmit
 Goran Grgić - Franz Kirchmeier
 Krešimir Mikić - Robert Neuman

References

External links

2004 films
Croatian World War II films
Films directed by Antun Vrdoljak
Films shot in Croatia
Croatian war films
War films set in Partisan Yugoslavia
2000s war films